The 1918 Boston College football team was an American football team that represented Boston College as an independent during the 1918 college football season. Led by Frank Morrissey in his first and only season as head coach, Boston College compiled a record of 5–2.

Schedule

References

Boston College
Boston College Eagles football seasons
Boston College football
1910s in Boston